The Armenian Table Soccer Federation, also known as the Armenian Table Football Federation, is the regulating body of table soccer in Armenia, governed by the Armenian Olympic Committee. The headquarters of the federation is located in Yerevan.

History
The Armenian Table Soccer Federation is currently led by president Gor Avetisyan. The Federation was established on 16 July 2019 and organizes Armenia's participation in European and international table soccer competitions. The Federation also organizes national table soccer tournaments and championships, such as the Armenian Open Cup. The Federation is a full member of the International Table Soccer Federation, within the "European Division".

See also 
 Football Federation of Armenia
 Sport in Armenia

References

External links 
Armenian Table Soccer Federation official website
Armenian Table Soccer Federation on Facebook

Sports governing bodies in Armenia
Table football organizations